Jack Elliott Creek is a stream in the Capital Regional District of British Columbia, Canada. Located on southern Vancouver Island, it flows from its source to its mouth as a right tributary of Loss Creek.

Natural history
The mouth of the creek, below British Columbia Highway 14, falls within Juan de Fuca Provincial Park.

Course
Loss Creek flows to the Strait of Juan de Fuca on the Pacific Ocean.

References

Rivers of Vancouver Island
Juan de Fuca region